Buccinanops is a genus of sea snails, marine gastropod mollusks in the family Buccinanopsidae, the Nassa mud snails or dog whelks and the like.

Species
 Buccinanops cochlidium (Dillwyn, 1817)
 Buccinanops latus Pastorino & Simone, 2021
 Buccinanops monilifer (Kiener, 1834)
Species brought into synonymy
 Buccinanops deformis (King, 1832): synonym of Buccinastrum deforme (P. P. King, 1832)
 Buccinastrum duartei Klappenbach, 1961: synonym of Buccinastrum duartei (Klappenbach, 1961) (original combination)
 Buccinanops globulosus (Kiener, 1834): synonym of Buccinastrum deforme (P. P. King, 1832)
 Buccinanops gradatus (Deshayes, 1844): synonym of Buccinanops cochlidium (Dillwyn, 1817)
 Buccinanops lamarckii (Kiener, 1834): synonym of Buccinanops cochlidium (Dillwyn, 1817)
 Buccinanops paytensis (Kiener, 1834): synonym of Buccinastrum paytense (Kiener, 1834)
 Buccinanops uruguayensis (Pilsbry, 1897): synonym of Buccinastrum uruguayense (Pilsbry, 1897)
 Buccinanops validus (Dunker, 1852): synonym of Pusionella valida (Dunker, 1852)
 Buccinanops vittatus (Linnaeus, 1767): synonym of Bullia vittata (Linnaeus, 1767)

References

External links
 Pastorino, G. (1993). "The taxonomic status of Buccinanops d'Orbigny, 1841 (Gastropoda: Nassariidae)". The Veliger. 36 (2): 160-165.
 Galindo, L. A.; Puillandre, N.; Utge, J.; Lozouet, P. & Bouchet, P. (2016). "The phylogeny and systematics of the Nassariidae revisited (Gastropoda, Buccinoidea)". Molecular Phylogenetics and Evolution. 99: 337-353.

Buccinanopsidae